The 2017 Asian Youth Para Games, also known as the 3rd Asian Youth Para Games was a third edition of multi-sport event for Asian athletes with disability. This event was held in Dubai, United Arab Emirates.

Venues
Source
 Dubai Club for People of Determination - Athletics, Goalball, Powerlifting, Table tennis
 Al Wasl Club - Badminton
 Shabab Al Ahli Club - Boccia
 Hamdan Sports Complex - Swimming

The Games

Participating nations
Source

 (7)
 (41)
 (35)
 (25)
 (41)
 (116) (Top Nation)
 (26)
 (89)
 (23)
 (1)
 (40)
 (33)
 (6)
 (3)
 (12)
 (5) 
 (2) 
 (4)
 (2)
 (17)
 (2)
 (29)
 (8)
 (80)
 (3)
 (6)
 (31) (host)
 (10)
 (15)
 (3)

Sports
Archery, Bowling, and Chess were canceled due to shortage of athletes.

 Athletics 
 Badminton
 Boccia 
 Goalball
 Powerlifting
 Swimming 
 Table tennis

Medal table
Source

See also
 Paralympics
 Asian Youth Para Games
 2009 Asian Youth Para Games
 2013 Asian Youth Para Games

References

External links
 Asian Paralympic Committee
 

Sports competitions in Dubai
2017
2017 in Asian sport
2017 in Emirati sport
Asian Youth Para Games